Killarney railway station is a station on the Mallow to Tralee line serving the town of Killarney in County Kerry.

It is situated next to the bus station and Killarney Outlet Centre. Adjacent to the station on the approach road is the Great Southern Hotel which was built for the railway in 1854 and was owned by CIE until 1984.

The station has a moderately large stone building on the southside of the main platform, and a short overall roof.
Since the platform was extended during the Mallow-Tralee mini-CTC scheme very little of the main platform is covered.  There is also a bay serving the south face of the main platform which is several carriage lengths shorter than the main platform and terminates in buffer stops just short of the main station building.
The former freight yard is opposite the main buildings on the northside of the station.

Trains running from Mallow to Tralee calling at Killarney run into either the main platform or the bay platform then reverse into the headshunt to gain the line to Tralee.
Trains from Tralee to Mallow pass the station and reverse in (if travelling towards Mallow).

Most of the services on the line are now operated by bi-directional diesel multiple unit trains. Locomotive hauled trains from Tralee to Cork, Mallow and Dublin simply passed the station, stopped, then reversed into the platforms, then to continue on their way to Mallow with the engine always at the "right-end" - the reverse applied with trains from Mallow to Tralee which entered the station, reversed out and continued on their way, again with the locomotive at the right end without running round. The situation is different at Kilkenny where as direction was changed, locomotives had to be detached and put on the front of the train. A change of ends for locomotives was required. At Killarney there is also a facing crossover east of the station that allows trains in either direction to bypass Killarney Station, but it has been used for this purpose only rarely since freight trains to Tralee ended a few years ago.

The station opened on 15 July 1853 as the terminus of a 40-mile branch from Mallow.  This was subsequently extended to Tralee.

See also
 List of railway stations in Ireland

References

External links

Irish Rail Killarney Station Website

Iarnród Éireann stations in County Kerry
Railway stations in County Kerry
Railway stations opened in 1853
Railway stations in the Republic of Ireland opened in 1853